Minch may refer to:

Places
 The Minch, sea channel separating the Outer Hebrides from the mainland of Scotland
 Minch-duvant-Vèrtan, local dialect name for Meix-devant-Virton, Belgium

People
 Bloomfield H. Minch (1864–1929), President of the New Jersey Senate
Matthew Minch (1857–1921), Irish nationalist politician
 Oscar F. Minch (1868–1953), member of the Wisconsin State Assembly
 Sydney Minch (1893–1970), Irish politician

See also
 
 Minich (disambiguation)